A cobweb plot, or Verhulst diagram is a visual tool used in the dynamical systems field of mathematics to investigate the qualitative behaviour of one-dimensional iterated functions, such as the logistic map. Using a cobweb plot, it is possible to infer the long term status of an initial condition under repeated application of a map.

Method

For a given iterated function f: R → R, the plot consists of a diagonal (x = y) line and a curve representing y = f(x). To plot the behaviour of a value , apply the following steps.

This has the coordinates.
 Plot horizontally across from this point to the diagonal line. This has the coordinates.
 Plot vertically from the point on the diagonal to the function curve. This has the coordinates.
 Repeat from step 2 as required.

Interpretation

On the cobweb plot, a stable fixed point corresponds to an inward spiral, while an unstable fixed point is an outward one.  It follows from the definition of a fixed point that these spirals will center at a point where the diagonal y=x line crosses the function graph.  A period 2 orbit is represented by a rectangle, while greater period cycles produce further, more complex closed loops. A chaotic orbit would show a 'filled out' area, indicating an infinite number of non-repeating values.

See also
 Jones diagram – similar plotting technique
 Fixed-point iteration – iterative algorithm to find fixed points (produces a cobweb plot)

References

Plots (graphics)
Dynamical systems